Ryan Laight (born 16 November 1985 in Barnsley, England) who plays for Ossett Town. He plays in defence.

Ryan has come through the youth ranks with Barnsley, he made his debut on 4 February 2004 against Bristol City.

On 3 October 2006, Ryan and fellow Barnsley teammate Thomas Harban joined Conference National side Tamworth on loan. Both Laight and Harban made their first appearance for Tamworth against Aldershot Town.

External links

1985 births
Living people
English footballers
Association football defenders
Barnsley F.C. players
Tamworth F.C. players
Alfreton Town F.C. players
Matlock Town F.C. players
Ossett Town F.C. players
Wakefield F.C. players
Northern Premier League players
Footballers from Barnsley